Niniane can refer to:

A priestess in Arthurian legend who succeeded Viviane as Lady of the Lake, also portrayed in
Merlin der Zauberer by Wolfgang Müller von Königswinter
The Last Enchantment by Mary Stewart
The Mists of Avalon by Marion Zimmer Bradley
"Niniane (Lady Of The Lake)", a song by Dutch group Kayak (band)